This was the first edition of the tournament.

Robin Anderson and Amandine Hesse won the title, defeating Estelle Cascino and Sarah Beth Grey in the final, 6–3, 7–6(7–2).

Seeds

Draw

Draw

References
Main Draw

ITF Féminin Le Neubourg - Doubles